AK-7, also known as "The Musical Phenomenon", is a Mexican Duranguense band formed in 2007. They released their first album with ten songs, three of them unpublished and a bonus track.

History
On May 28, 2007, 7 long-time members of the group of K-Paz De La Sierra left because of disputes with the former lead singer Sergio Gomez, and formed a new group named AK-7. The name is derived from "Antes(Before) K-Paz" and the number of members that left. They released their first album soon after, El Avion de Las Tres, following their first single of the same name "El Avion De Las Tres".

On April 1, 2008, AK-7 announced they were recording a new album called Renaciendo. Singles from the album were "Digale" and "Hotel De Carretera".

On February 23, 2010, AK-7 released their third album, Reafirmando El Vuelo, with the singles "Loco Enamorado" and "El Diferente".

On November 10, 2010, AK-7 released their fourth album, Locura Romantica, with the singles "Dame Un Beso Y Dime Adios" and Locura Automatica

Members

 Jose Perez - vocals
 Luis Kpazillo -Keyboard
 Alvaro Hernandez - Keyboard
 Armando Rodríguez - tambora
 Carmelo Gamboa - drums
 Oscar Ledesma - Keyboard (Concerts Outside Of The U.S.A ONLY)

Discography

Albums
 2007: El Avion De Las Tres
 2008: Renaciendo
 2010: Reafirmando El Vuelo
 2010: Locura Romantica
 2013: Arquitecto De Tu Amor
 2018: El Amor De Su Vida

Singles
 2007: "El Avion De Las Tres"
 2007: "La Llamada"
 2008: "Este Corazon Llora"
 2008: "Digale"
 2009: "Hotel de Carretera"
 2009: "Loco Enamorado"
 2010: "El Diferente"
 2010: "Dame un Beso Y Dime Adios"
 2011: "Locura Automatica"
 2015: "Insensible"
 2021: "Hazme Creer"
 2021: "Ya Acabo"

Awards
Lo Nuestro Awards: 2009 Breakout Artist or Group of the Year

References

External links
 AK-7's Official site and history

Duranguense music groups
Mexican musical groups